The CONCACAF Gold Cup is North America's major tournament in senior men's football and determines the continental champion. Until 1989, the tournament was known as CONCACAF Championship. It is currently held every two years. From 1996 to 2005, nations from other confederations have regularly joined the tournament as invitees. In earlier editions, the continental championship was held in different countries, but since the inception of the Gold Cup in 1991, the United States are constant hosts or co-hosts.

From 1973 to 1989, the tournament doubled as the confederation's World Cup qualification. CONCACAF's representative team at the FIFA Confederations Cup was decided by a play-off between the winners of the last two tournament editions in 2015 via the CONCACAF Cup, but was then discontinued along with the Confederations Cup.

Since the inaugural tournament in 1963, the Gold Cup was held 26 times and has been won by seven different nations, most often by Mexico (11 titles).

Guatemala have qualified for 19 of those tournaments and were particularly successful in the 1960s, winning the title in 1967 and finishing in Second Place in 1965 and 1969. Because of a FIFA suspension from October 2016 to March 2018, they were disqualified from the 2017 qualifiers and were not able to enter qualification for 2019 at all.

Overall record

Match overview

Record by opponent

References

Countries at the CONCACAF Gold Cup
Guatemala national football team